Phyllurus caudiannulatus, also known as the Bulburin leaf-tailed gecko or ringed thin-tail gecko is a gecko found in Australia. It is endemic to the Bulburin State Forest in the Dawes Range and Many Peaks Range in southeastern Queensland.

References

Phyllurus
Geckos of Australia
Reptiles of Queensland
Endemic fauna of Australia
Reptiles described in 1975
Taxa named by Jeanette Covacevich